Madhubani may refer to:

Madhubani district in Bihar, India
Madhubani, Bihar, the city serving as district headquarters
Madhubani (Lok Sabha constituency)
Madhubani (Vidhan Sabha constituency)
Madhubani art
Madhubani, Nepal